Battle of Kosovo may refer to:
 Battle of Kosovo (1369)
 Battle of Kosovo (1389)
 Battle of Tripolje (1402)
 Battle of Kosovo (1448)
 Battle of Kosovo (1831)
 Battle of Kosovo (1915)
 Kosovo Operation (1944)
 Insurgency in Kosovo (1995–1998)
 Kosovo War (1999)
 Battle of Kosovo (film)